Valerian "Vako" Gvilia (born 24 May 1994) is a Georgian professional footballer who plays as a midfielder for the Georgia national team. He also has Ukrainian citizenship. Besides Ukraine, he has played in Belarus, Switzerland, and Poland.

Club career
Gvilia is product of youth team system FC Metalurh Zaporizhya. He made his debut for FC Metalurh entering as a second time playing against FC Dnipro Dnipropetrovsk on 15 August 2014 in the Ukrainian Premier League. Gvilia signed a contract with Belarusian club BATE Borisov in early July 2016.

In January 2018, Gvilia signed a three-year deal with Swiss Super League side Luzern. 

From 2019 untl 2021, he played for Polish side Legia Warsaw, with whom he won two national championships. 

On 31 August 2021, he was announced as a player of the Polish vice-champion, Raków Częstochowa. On 30 January 2023, having not made an appearance for the club since late August 2022, he terminated his contract by mutual consent.

International career
Gvilia was named in Georgia's senior squad for 2018 FIFA World Cup qualifiers against Republic of Ireland and Wales in October 2016.

Career statistics

Club

International goals
Scores and results list Georgia's goal tally first.

|-
!scope=row|
| 5 September 2017 || Ernst-Happel-Stadion, Vienna, Austria ||  || align=center | 1–0 || align=center | 1–1 || 2018 FIFA World Cup qualification
|-
!scope=row|
| 16 October 2018 || Daugava Stadium, Riga, Latvia ||  || align=center | 2–0 || align=center | 3–0 || 2018–19 UEFA Nations League D
|-
!scope=row|
| 7 June 2019 || Boris Paichadze National Stadium, Tbilisi, Georgia ||  || align=center | 1–0 || align=center | 3–0 || UEFA Euro 2020 qualification
|}

Honours
BATE Borisov
Belarusian Premier League: 2016
Belarusian Super Cup: 2017

Legia Warsaw
Ekstraklasa: 2019–20, 2020–21

Raków Częstochowa
Polish Cup: 2021–22

References

External links
 Profile at FFU Official Site (Ukr)
 

1994 births
Living people
Footballers from Georgia (country)
Georgia (country) international footballers
Georgia (country) youth international footballers
Ukrainian footballers
Ukrainian expatriate sportspeople in Switzerland
Georgian emigrants to Ukraine
Expatriate sportspeople from Georgia (country) in Switzerland
Association football midfielders
Expatriate footballers from Georgia (country)
Expatriate footballers in Belarus
Expatriate footballers in Switzerland
Expatriate footballers in Poland
Ukrainian Premier League players
Swiss Super League players
Ekstraklasa players
FC Metalurh Zaporizhzhia players
FC Minsk players
FC BATE Borisov players
FC Luzern players
Górnik Zabrze players
Legia Warsaw players
Raków Częstochowa players
Ukraine under-21 international footballers
People from Zugdidi
Ukrainian expatriate sportspeople in Poland
Ukrainian expatriate sportspeople in Belarus